Giorgio Puia (8 March 1938) is an Italian football manager and former player who played as a defender.

Club career

During his club career, Puia played for A.S. Pro Gorizia, U.S. Triestina Calcio, Vicenza and Torino.

International career

Puia earned 7 caps for the Italy national football team between 1962 and 1970, and was included in the Italian squad for the 1970 FIFA World Cup, although his only World Cup appearances came in the 1970 qualifying tournament; Italy reached the final of the competition, only to lose out to Brazil 4–1. He made his international debut on 11 November 1962 against Austria, whilst his final appearance came on 10 May 1970 against Portugal.

Honours

Club
Torino
Coppa Italia (2): 1967–68, 1970–71

References

External links

1938 births
Living people
Italian footballers
Italy international footballers
1970 FIFA World Cup players
Serie A players
Serie B players
U.S. Triestina Calcio 1918 players
L.R. Vicenza players
Torino F.C. players
Association football defenders
A.S.D. La Biellese managers
A.S. Pro Gorizia players